Chapleau may refer to:

 Chapleau, Ontario, a township in Ontario
 Chapleau 61, a Michipicoten First Nation reserve in Ontario
 Chapleau 61A, a Chapleau Ojibway First Nation reserve in Ontario
 Chapleau 74, a Chapleau Ojibway First Nation reserve in Ontario
 Chapleau 74A, a Chapleau Ojibway First Nation reserve in Ontario
 Chapleau 75, a Chapleau Cree First Nation reserve in Ontario
 Chapleau Cree Fox Lake, a Chapleau Cree First Nation reserve in Ontario
 Chapleau (electoral district), a former Canadian federal electoral district
 Chapleau (provincial electoral district), a current Quebec electoral district
 Joseph-Adolphe Chapleau, former Quebec premier and lieutenant governor, for whom all three of the above were named